Necessary Evil is the sixth studio album by Israeli death metal band Salem, released on June 19, 2007.

The album includes the band's longest music piece, "Once Upon a Lifetime", which lasts more than 20 minutes, although it is divided into 5 parts in the album.

Track listing

Tracks 1-9 are by Salem & Nir Nakav.
Tracks 10-14 are by Nir Nakav.

Personnel
Ze'ev Tananboim - lead vocals
Lior Mizrachi - guitar
Nir Gutraiman - guitar
Michael Goldstein - bass
Nir Nakav - drums, percussion

References

2007 albums
Salem (Israeli band) albums
Season of Mist albums